Gümüşdamla (literally "silver drop") is a Turkish place name that may refer to the following places in Turkey:

 Gümüşdamla, Akseki, a village in the district of Akseki, Antalya Province
 Gümüşdamla, Aydıntepe, a village in the district of Aydıntepe, Bayburt Province

See also
 Gümüş (disambiguation), "silver"